Sir James Tyrrell (c. 1455 – 6 May 1502) was an English knight, a trusted servant of king Richard III of England.  He is known for allegedly confessing to the murders of the Princes in the Tower under Richard's orders.  William Shakespeare portrays Tyrrell as the man who organises the princes' murder in his 1593 play Richard III.

Family
James Tyrrell was the eldest son of William Tyrrell of Gipping in Suffolk, and Margaret Darcy, the daughter of Robert Darcy of Maldon, and the grandson of Sir John Tyrrell.

Career
Tyrrell's father was beheaded on Tower Hill on 23 February 1462, together with Sir Thomas Tuddenham and John Montgomery. John de Vere, 12th Earl of Oxford, and his eldest son and heir, Aubrey, were beheaded on 26 February and 20 February, respectively, after the discovery of an alleged plot to murder Edward IV. No records of the trials of the alleged conspirators have survived to shed light on what part, if any, Tyrrell's father played in the alleged conspiracy. He was not attainted, and his eldest son and heir's wardship and the custody of his lands were granted to Cecily Neville, Duchess of York, who sold them to William Tyrrell's widow in March 1463 for £50.

James Tyrrell fought on the Yorkist side at the Battle of Tewkesbury on 4 May 1471, and was knighted there by Edward IV. A few months later he entered the service of the future Richard III, then Duke of Gloucester. After Richard III assumed power, he was appointed High Sheriff of Cornwall in 1484. He was in France in 1485, and played no part in the Battle of Bosworth Field which signalled the end of the Yorkists and the start of the Tudor dynasty.

He returned to England in 1486 and was pardoned by King Henry VII on 16 June, and was pardoned again on 16 July. Sir Clements Markham considers that it was between these dates that the murder of the princes took place. Henry VII reappointed him governor of Guînes (in the English possession of Calais) in 1486. However, in 1501, Tyrrell lent his support to Edmund de la Pole, 3rd Duke of Suffolk, now the leading Yorkist claimant to the English throne, who was in voluntary exile. In the spring of 1501 Henry VII sent Thomas Lovell to Guînes to arrest Tyrrell and others, including Tyrrell's son, Thomas.

Tyrrell was charged with treason. Some years after his execution, Sir Thomas More in his "History of King Richard III" wrote that during his examination Tyrrell confessed to the murders of King Edward V of England and his brother Richard of Shrewsbury, Duke of York. According to More, he also implicated John Dighton as a perpetrator, and Dighton when questioned corroborated Tyrell's account.  But he was unable to say where the bodies were, claiming that they had been moved. The original document of Tyrrell's alleged confession was never produced. However, other contemporary accounts, notably that of Polydore Vergil, make no mention of the confession.

Tyrrell was tried and convicted of treason at the Guildhall in London on 2 May 1502 and executed four days later, on 6 May, together with one of his accomplices in aiding Suffolk, Sir John Wyndham. Tyrrell was buried at the church of the Austin Friars, London. He was attainted on 25 January 1504; however the attainder was reversed three years later, on 19 April 1507.

Marriage and issue
In 1469, Tyrrell married Anne Arundel, the daughter of John Arundel of Lanherne, by his first wife, Elizabeth Morley, daughter of Thomas, Lord Morley, by whom he had three sons and a daughter:

Sir Thomas Tyrrell (d. 1551) of Gipping, who married firstly Margaret Willoughby, daughter of Christopher Willoughby, 10th Baron Willoughby de Eresby, by whom he had a son, Sir John Tyrrell (d. 1574), who married Elizabeth Munday, the daughter of Sir John Munday (d. 1537), Lord Mayor of London, and a daughter, Anne Tyrrell, who married Sir John Clere of Ormesby.
James Tyrrell (d. 1539) of Columbine Hall in Stowupland, who married Anne Hotoft.
William Tyrrell.
Anne Tyrrell, who married Sir Richard Wentworth (d. 1528) of Nettlestead, by whom she was the mother of Thomas Wentworth, 1st Baron Wentworth.

Further discussion
In a television programme first broadcast on Channel 4 in the UK on 21 March 2015, the historian David Starkey announced his discovery in royal records that both Henry VII and his wife Elizabeth, the sister of Edward V and Richard Duke of York, were present throughout Tyrrell's trial.

However, contemporary documents originally retrieved by scholar Rosemary Horrox record that the king and queen were lodged in the Royal Apartments at the Tower during Tyrrell's trial, which was not held at the Tower itself.

Notes

References

Further reading

External links
James Tyrell
Will of Sir Thomas Tyrrell of Gipping, Suffolk, proved 25 August 1551, PROB 11/34/309, National Archives Retrieved 16 July 2013
Will of Sir John Tyrrell of Gipping, Suffolk, proved 22 June 1574, PROB 11/56/322, National Archives Retrieved 16 July 2013

1450s births
1502 deaths
15th-century English people
16th-century English people
Medieval English knights
People executed under Henry VII of England
Executed English people
Recipients of English royal pardons
High Sheriffs of Cornwall
People executed by Tudor England by decapitation
Executions at the Tower of London
16th-century executions by England
Edward V of England
People of the Wars of the Roses
Burials at Austin Friars, London
Knights Bachelor